Schwartze may refer to:

People
Hermann Schwartze (1837-1910), aurist
Johan Georg Schwartze (1814-1874), painter
Peter Schwartze (born 1931), neurophysiologist
Stefan Schwartze (born 1974), German politician
Thérèse Schwartze (1851-1918), painter

Places
Alphonse J. Schwartze Memorial Catholic Center, chancery office 
Schwartze Mansion, historic mansion

See also
Schvartze, derogatory Yiddish term